Făget (or Fatschet) is a town in Timiș County, Romania, with a population of about 7,500. The town administers ten villages: Bătești, Begheiu Mic, Bichigi, Brănești, Bunea Mare, Bunea Mică (depopulated), Colonia Mică, Jupânești, Povârgina and Temerești.

Name 
Its name literally means "beech forest" in Romanian.

Geography 
Făget is located in the southwest of Romania, in the contact area of the Lugoj Plain with the Lugoj Hills, on the upper course of the Bega River. Within Timiș County, it is located in its eastern part, 98 km from Timișoara and 33 km from Lugoj, to which it is connected by the national road 68A. The same road to the east connects the town with Deva, 68 km away. The town is also crossed by CFR line 212 (Lugoj–Făget–Ilia).

History 

Făget Fortress is documented for the first time in 1548, as the property of Jakab Békés and bearing the name Fagyath. Between 1594–1602 Făget was the property of the Ban of Lugoj. In 1602 it was besieged and destroyed by the Turks, after which it fell into ruin. For 150 years it has been the subject of fierce confrontations between Romanians, Turks and Austrians, which is also confirmed by archaeological excavations. The picturesque landscape of Făget, the intense spiritual activity and its famous fairs attracted the attention of some foreign travelers who passed through Transylvania and Banat. In 1660, Turkish traveler Evliya Çelebi, passing through Făget, described the medieval fortress:

Along with the military fortress, the civilian settlement also evolved, becoming in a relatively short period of time the most important locality in the area. The fortress was finally demolished by the Turks in 1699. Immediately after Banat was conquered by the Austrians in 1717, Făget had only 20 houses left, but it was the center of a district with 42 communes. After this period of decline, the town began to grow again and in 1787 received the right to hold eight fairs a year. At the end of the 18th century, Johann Lehmann wrote:

On the same note, Italian traveler  noted that, at the beginning of the 19th century, Făget had "200 Romanian houses with two churches and over 30 German houses with a small but clean church, served by the Minorite monks from Lugoj". Făget was also an important connection point between Banat and Transylvania, here being a "custom house for Transylvania and Hungary".

In the 17th and 18th centuries, attempts were made to colonize workers of other nationalities to work on forest exploitations, but the impact is small and Făget remains a center of Romanianism at a time when western Banat was intensely colonized. In 1900, attempts were made to settle the first families of Hungarian settlers in Colonia Mică.

On 5 July 1994, Făget was declared a town, with 10 villages subordinated to it.

Demographics 

Făget had a population of 6,761 inhabitants at the 2011 census, down 6% from the 2002 census. Most inhabitants are Romanians (89.34%), larger minorities being represented by Hungarians (3.85%) and Ukrainians (2.09%). For 3.03% of the population, ethnicity is unknown. By religion, most inhabitants are Orthodox (72.71%), but there are also minorities of Pentecostals (13.28%), Roman Catholics (4.17%), Baptists (2.43%), Adventists (2.41%) and Reformed (1.52%). For 3.17% of the population, religious affiliation is unknown.

Economy 
The economic sector of production is represented by companies active in the field of leather processing in footwear and leather goods, exploitation and processing of wood of various essences, from lumber to furniture, a section for exploitation and processing of quartz sand and companies active in various branches of the food industry, especially milk processing and pastry production. In the village of Jupânești, there is a tradition in pottery, which is declining as an economic activity, but with a high potential.

Twin towns 
Făget is twinned with:
  Cervinara
  Elek
  Mirebeau-sur-Bèze

Gallery

References 

Towns in Romania
Populated places in Timiș County
Localities in Romanian Banat